Wang Chen (born August 7, 1962) is a Chinese pulmonologist and physician currently serving as vice-president of the Chinese Academy of Engineering (CAE) and president of the Peking Union Medical College. He is a member of the Chinese Hospital Association (CHA) and Chinese Medical Doctor Association (CMDA).

Biography
Wang was born in Dezhou, Shandong, on August 7, 1962. He graduated from the Capital University of Medical Sciences, where he received his bachelor's degree in 1985 and doctor's degree in 1991, both in medicine. He carried out postdoctoral research at the University of Texas in 1994. 

He worked at the Beijing Chaoyang Hospital between 1993 and 2013, where he successively was deputy director, vice-president, and president. From January 2013 to September 2014, he had a brief assignment to the Ministry of Health. In September 2014 he was appointed president of the China-Japan Friendship Hospital. After this office was terminated in January 2018, he became president of Peking Union Medical College. He has been vice-president of the Chinese Academy of Engineering (CAE) in May 2018.

On February 5, 2020, Wang was interviewed by Bai Yansong on China's national TV and said that the situation in Wuhan was grim, and many  patients were not admitted to the hospital in time, which is a great pressure; he was one of early and high-profile advocates of Fangcang Hospitals for COVID-19 patients in China.

He is a delegate to the 19th National Congress of the Chinese Communist Party and a member of the 13th Standing Committee of the Chinese People's Political Consultative Conference.

Contributions
During the 2003 Beijing SARS outbreak and the 2009 flu pandemic, he was appointed head of the National Clinical Expert Group, formulating a series of diagnosis and treatment procedures to treat large numbers of patients.

Honours and awards
 November 2013 Member of the Chinese Academy of Engineering (CAE)
 December 1, 2019 Wu Jieping Medical Prize
 October 19, 2020 Foreign associate of the National Academy of Medicine (NAM)

References

External links 
Wang Chen  on the Peking Union Medical College  
Wang Chen on the Chinese Academy of Engineering (CAE)  

1962 births
Living people
Capital University of Medical Sciences alumni
Chinese pulmonologists
COVID-19 researchers
People from Dezhou
Physicians from Shandong
Members of the Chinese Academy of Engineering
Members of the Standing Committee of the 13th Chinese People's Political Consultative Conference
Academic staff of Peking Union Medical College